Sidharth (born 1956 in Bassian, near Raikot town in Ludhiana district of Punjab), is an Indian painter and sculptor.

Biography

While still at school in his village Sidharth started painting signboards. Working as an apprentice with village mason Tara Mistry, he learned the art of creating murals and friezes. Later he went on to learn Thangka painting technique from the Tibetan monks in Mcleodganj. He spent some time with artist Sobha Singh (painter) too at his studio in Andretta, Himachal Pradesh. After doing a five-year diploma in painting from Government College of Arts, Chandigarh he went to Sweden for some time.  He is now settled in New Delhi where he has his own studio.

Sidharth has participated in more than 135 group shows in UK, Sweden, the US, Singapore and Hong Kong besides India.

An honorary degree of DLitt was conferred on Sidharth in 2012 by Punjabi University, Patiala.

References

Indian male painters
1956 births
Living people
People from Ludhiana district
20th-century Indian painters
Painters from Punjab, India
Government College of Art, Chandigarh alumni
20th-century Indian male artists